This is an alphabetical list of pigeon breeds. Pigeons and doves are members of the bird family Columbidae. Doves tend to be smaller and pigeons larger, although this distinction is not consistently applied.

The birds listed here are breeds of the domestic pigeon (Columba livia domestica). Other Columbidae species (e.g., the domesticated Barbary dove, Streptopelia risoria) have been developed into breeds, but these are generally simple colour variations. See also List of Columbidae species.

A
 Aachen Cropper (D/326)
 Aachen Lacquer Shield Owl pigeon (= Aachen Luster Shield, ELFP-No. D/705; = Aachen Shield Owl)
 Aargae Peak-crested
 Abu Abse-Dewlap (D/063)
 African Owl pigeon (GB/710)
 Agaran Pigeon (RUS(D)/893)
 Alpine Swift pigeon
 Alsace Cropper (B/308)
 Altenburg Trumpeter (D/513)
 American Bohemian Pouter
American Cam Cropper
 American Flying Bald-head
 American Flying Flight
 American Flying Tumbler
 American Giant Homer (= Giant Homer (ESKT/030))
 American Giant Tumbler
 American Giant Runt
 American Modern Flight
 American Roller
 American Show Racer (ESKT/031)
 American Strassers
 Amsterdam Beard Tumbler (NL/929)
 Anatolian Owl pigeon (D/713)
 Anatolian Ringbeater (TR(D)/1104)
 Ancient Tumbler (D/907)
 Apatin Tumbler (SRB/939)
 Antwerp pigeon (= Show Antwerp, (GB/026))
 Antwerp Smerle (B/701)
 Apatin Tumbler (SRB/939)
 Arabian Trumpeter (D/514)
 Arad Barred Highflyer
 Arad Tumbler (RO(D)/933)
 Archangel pigeon (= Gimpel (D/402))
 Archangel White Trjasuni
 Argovien White-tail (CH/410)
 Armenian Tumbler
 Asiatic Crack Tumbler (Turkish Takla Tumbler)
 Australian Performing Tumbler
 Australian Saddleback Tumbler
 Austrian Fischer Pigeon, Australian Fisher Pigeon (A/486)
 Austrian Magpie Cropper (A/351)
 Austrian White-tail (A/464) name EE black tail

B

 Baja Tumbler (H/954)
 Baku Boinije
 Barb (GB/102)
 Bango
 Barbarisi Owl pigeon (SYR(D)/725)
 Barbet of Liège (B/723)
 Baska Tumbler
 Basra Dewlap (F/041)
 Bavarian Cropper (D/315)
 Bavarian Highflyer (D/984)
 Beak-crested Jacobin
 Beauty Homer de Lige (B/035)
 Belgian Beauty Homer (B/034)
 Belgian Highflyer (B/876)
 Belgian Tumbler (B/882)
 Belgian Ringbeater (B/1102)
 Benesov Pigeon (CZ/054)
 Bergamasco (I/059)
 Bergen Tumbler (N/879)
 Berlin Long-faced Tumbler (D/805)
 Berlin Medium-faced Tumbler
 Berlin Muffed Tumbler (D/806)
 Berlin Short-faced Tumbler (D/904)
 Bernburg Trumpeter (D/504)
 Berne Gugger (CH/411)
 Berne Half-beak (CH/483)
 Berne Lark pigeon (CH/412)
 Berne Peak-crested
 Berne Ribbon-tail (CH/414)
 Berne Tiger-head (CH/413)
 Berne White-tail (CH/415)
 Bernhardin Magpie pigeon (D/446)
 Bialostocka Krymka Tumbler (PL/935)
 Bihac Roller (BiH/1007)
 Bijeljina Roller (BiH/1008)
 Birmingham Roller (GB/918)
 Blagodar Tumbler (RUS(D)/970)
 Blue Sovater (H/061)
 Blue Tumbler of Cluj (= Cluj-Napoca Blue (RO/975))
 Bohemian Bagdad (CZ/110)
 Bohemian Cropper (CZ/321)
 Bohemian Fairy Swallow pigeon
 Bohemian Ice Cropper (CZ/325)
 Bohemian Pigeon (D/401)
 Bohemian Steller Cropper (CZ/345)
 Bohemian Tiger Swallow pigeon, clean-legged (CZ/478) and muffed (CZ/477)
 Bohemian Trumpeter (CZ/516)
 Bohemian Tumbler (CZ/967)
 Bokhara Trumpeter (GB/501)
 Bokhara Tumbler
 Borino (E/927)
 Boston Blue Tumbler
 Botoșani Tumbler (RO/952)
 Bremen Tumbler (D/814)
 Breslau Tumbler (D/911)
 British Show Racer
 Briver Black-head (F/047)
 Brod Tumbler (HR(D)/950)
 Brunner Pouter (CZ/330)
 Bucharest Ciung Highflier
 Bucharest Show Tumbler
 Buda Grizzle Budapest Short-faced Tumbler
 Budapest Coloured (H/847) (= Budapest Highflyer)
 Budapest Highflier (Poltli)
 Budapest Kiebitz (H/846)
 Budapest Muffed Tumbler
 Budapest Short-beak (H/844) (= Budapest Short-faced Tumbler)
 Budapest Tumbler, stork-marked muffed (H/955)
 Budapest Whiteflight Highflyer (H/845)
 Budapest Whiteside (H/843)
 Buga Pigeon (H/062)
 Bukarest black Hanging Flight Tumbler (RO/972)
 Bulgarian Shield Owl pigeon (BG(B)/727)
 Bulgarian White Shield Roller (BG/986)
 Bursa Tumbler (TR(D)/894)
 Bácka Long-beak Tumbler (SRB(D)/859) (= Sombor)

C

 Cakal Roller (TR(D)/895)
 Cambalhota Português
 Campagnolo Sammarinese® (RSM – registered breed)
 Canario Cropper (E/344)
 Carneau (F/007)
 Carrier (GB/101) (= English Carrier)
 Catalan Tumbler (E/928)
 Catalan Head and Neck Tumbler
 Catalan Laced Bordench Mondain
 Cauchois (F/008)
 Central Asiatic Roller
 Chinese Flying Pigeon (= Chinese Nasal Tuft; Chinese Tumbler (D/914))
 Chinese Owl pigeon (D/609)
 Chistopolian High-flying Pigeon
 Chorrera (E/610)
 Claudia Pigeon
 Clean-legged Full-head Swallow pigeon
 Clean-legged Spot Swallow pigeon
 Cluj-Napoca Blue (RO/975)
 Cluj-Napoca Roller (RO/976)
 Cluj-Napoca Tumbler (RO/979)
 Coburg Lark pigeon (D/025)
 Colillano Cropper (E/336)
 Cologne Tumbler (D/827)
 Craiova chestnutbrown Tumbler (RO/973)
 Crescent
 Crested Picard (F/017)
 Crested Soultz (F/018)
 Criador Lusitano (P/016)
 Csepel Tumbler (H/956)
 Cumulet (GB/822)
 Czech Bagdad (= Bohemian Bagdad (CZ/110))
 Czech Ice Pouter (= Bohemian Ice Cropper (CZ/325))
 Czech Muffed Tumbler
 Czech Trumpeter (= Bohemian Trumpeter 
(CZ/516))

D

 Damascene (GB/042)
 Danish Copper (DK/349)
 Danish Jacobin (DK/604)
 Danish Suabian (DK/404)
 Danish Tumbler (DK/810)
 Danzig Highflyer (D/816)
 Debrecin Roller (H/849)
 Denizli Bangosu
 Dobrudshan Roller (BG/988)
 Dolapci
 Domestic Show Flight (ESKT/915)
 Domino Frill (GB/715)
 Donek (= Dunek)
 Dragoon (GB/104)
 Dresden Trumpeter (D/505)
 Dutch Beauty Homer (NL/033)
 Dutch Cropper (NL/302)
 Dutch Curled Cropper (NL/352)
 Dutch Helmet (NL/825)
 Dutch Highflyer (NL/824)

E

 East Prussian Tumbler (D/819)
 Echterding Colour Pigeon (D/443)
 Egyptian Frill 
 Ervin Swift pigeon (GB/043)
 Egyptian Tumbler
 Eichbühl (CH/484)
 Eisk Double-crested Tumbler (RUS(D)/870)
 Elbing White-head Tumbler (D/908)
 Elster Cropper (D/305)
 Elster Purzler (= Old German Magpie Tumbler  (D/828))
 English Barb (= Barb (GB/102))
 English Carrier (= Carrier (GB/101))
 English Exhibition Homer (= Exhibition Homer (GB/028))
 English Fantail (= Garden Fantail (GB/608))
 English Long-faced Tumbler (clean-legged (GB/830) and muffed (GB/831))
 English Magpie pigeon (GB/807)
 English Nun (= Nun (GB/896))
 English Owl pigeon (GB/712)
 English Pouter (GB/310)
 English Short-faced Tumbler (GB/832)
 English Show Homer (= Show Homer (GB/027))
 English Show Tippler (GB/829) → Tippler
 English Trumpeter (ESKT/508)
 Erlau Tumbler (H/860)
 Escampadissa Tumbler (E/923)
 Exhibition Flying Tippler (GB/919) → Tippler
 Exhibition Homer (GB/028)

F

 Fantail (GB/606)
 Fat Shan Blue
 Félegyháza Tumbler (H/858)
 Field Pigeon (D/444) (= Franconian Field Pigeon)
 Field Pigeon, clean-legged (D/406)
 Fish Eye Roller
 Flanders Smerle (B/702)
 Florentine (I/201)
 Flying Oriental Roller
 Flying Performing Roller
 Flying Saddle Homer
 Flying Tippler
 Fork-tailed
 Franconian Bagdad (D/106)
 Franconian Field Pigeon (= Field Pigeon (D/444))
 Franconian Magpie pigeon (D/445)
 Franconian Toy Self
 Franconian Trumpeter (D/512)
 Franconian Velvet Shield (D/449)
 French Bagdad (B/107)
 French Highflyer (F/884)
 French Krymka Tumbler (F/971)
 French Mondain (F/006)
 French Owl pigeon (F/717)
 French Pouter (B/307)
 French Sottobanca (F/020)
 French Tumbler (F/883)
 Frillback (D/601)

G

 Gaditano Pouter (= Gaditano Cropper (E/337))
 Galatz Roller (RO/974)
 Garden Fantail (GB/608) (= English Fantail)
 Gascogne Pigeon (F/014)
 Gelderland Slenke (NL/1106)
 Genuine Homer (GB/029)
 Georgian Black-tailed, Yellow-tailed, Red-tailed, White-tailed
 Georgian Sizaghrani
 Georgian Kuduli 
 German Barb (D/103)
 German Beak-crested Trumpeter (D/503)
 German Beauty Homer (D/032)
 German Colour-tail Owl pigeon (D/709)
 German Double-crested Trumpeter (D/502)
 German Fork-tail Trumpeter (D/509)
 German Long-faced Tumbler (D/801)
 German Modena (D/206)
 German Nun (D/897)
 German Shield Owl pigeon (D/708)
 German Show Tippler (D/840) → Tippler 
 Ghent Cropper (B/309)
 Ghent Owl pigeon (B/718)
 Giant American Crest
 Giant Homer (ESKT/030) (= American Giant Homer)
 Giant Mallorquina Runt
 Giant Show Runt
 Gier (F/009)
 Gimpel (D/402) (= Archangel)
 Goeteborg Tumbler (S/878)
 Gola
 Gorguero Cropper (E/339)
 Granadino Pouter (E/343)
 Griwuni Tumbler (RUS(D)/871)
 Groninger Slenke (NL/1105)
 Gumbinnen White-head Tumbler 
Gmbler (D/909)

H

 Hague Highflyer/Hagenaar (Dutch breed) (NL/875)
 Hamburg Helmet (D/900)
 Hamburg Schimmel (D/898)
 Hamburg Sticken (D/707)
 Hamburg Tumbler (D/899)
 Hamedan Highflyer Saxon
 Hana Pouter (CZ/314)
 Hannover Tumbler (D/813)
 Harzburg Trumpeter Pouter (D/506)
 Haskow Colour-head Tumbler (BG/991) (= Karabasch)
 Helmet Pigeons, a group of pigeon breeds
 Hessian Pouter (D/317)

 Hódmezövásárhelyer Show Crest Tumbler (H/959)
 
 Holle Cropper (NL/331)
 Homing Pigeon
 Horseman Pouter (GB/332)
 Hungarian (A/202)
 Hungarian Beauty Homer (H/036)
 Hungarian Buga Pigeon (= Buga Pigeon (H/062))
 Hungarian Cropper (H/347)
 Hungarian Dark-storked Highflyer  (H/966)
 Hungarian Egri Tumbler
 Hungarian Fantail (H/612)
 Hungarian Giant Pigeon (H/002)
 Hungarian Giant Pouter
 Hungarian Highflyer
 Hungarian Magpie Tumbler (H/958)
 Hungarian Short-beak
 Huppé Picard
 Hyacinth (NL/408)

I
 Ice Pigeon  (D/403)
 Indian Fantail (ESKT/607)
 Indian Gola
 Indian Pearl Highflier
 Iranian Highflying Breeds
 Irish Flying Tumbler
 Italian Owl pigeon (I/706)
 Italian Sottobanca (I/019)

J
 Jacobin (GB/605)
 Jassy Tumbler (RO/862)
 Jerezano Pouter
 Jewel Mondain
 Jiennense Cropper (E/340)

K
 Kaluga Tumbler (RUS/869)
 Karakand Fantail
 Kassel Tumbler (D/803)
 Katal
 Kazan Tumbler (RUS(D)/868)
 Kecskemét Tumbler (H/943)
 Kelebek
 Kiev Tumbler (RUS(D)/891)
 King pigeon (ESKT/204)
 Kiskunfelegyhaza Tumbler (H/944)
 Königsberg Colour-head Tumbler (D/905)
 Koenigsberg Moorhead
 Koenigsberg Reinaugen Tumbler (D/906)
 Komorn Tumbler (H/857)
 Konstanza Tumbler (RO/1003)
 Koros Tumbler (H/864)
 Kosice Roller (SK/931)
 Kosice Tumbler (SK/930)
 Kraków Magpie pigeon (PL/808)
 Krasnodar Tumbler (RUS(D)/949)

L

 Lacene (GB/409)
 Lahore (D/037)
 Laudino Sevillano Cropper (E/338)
 Lebanon (D/038)
 Lenardo
 Leuven Pouter (B/313)
 Lille Pouter (B/328)
 Lille Tumbler (F/1006)
 Limerick Tumbler (IRL/1001)
 Lome Tumbler (BG/989)
 Lower Bavarian Cropper (D/346)
 Low Silesian Muffed Tumbler (PL/961)
 Lucerne Copper Collar (CH/420)
 Lucerne Elmer (CH/418)
 Lucerne Gold Collar (CH/421)
 Lucerne Self (CH/417)
 Lucerne Shield (CH/419)
 Lucerne Tiger-head (CH/422)
 Lucerne White-tail (CH/423)
 Lugoj Roller (BG/990)
 Lusatian Tumbler (D/953) 
 Luster Pigeon (D/487)
 Luttich Owl pigeon (B/719)

M

 Madrasi Highflyer
 MacRhyme Turbit
 Magpie pigeon → English Magpie pigeon (GB/807)
 Majorcan Bort Runt
 Majorcan Esbart Roller
 Makó Highflyer (H/957)
 Mallorca Giant Pigeon (E/058)
 Maltese (A/203)
 Manotte (F/055)
 Marchenero Pouter (E/334)
 Mardin
 Mariola (P/056)
 Mariolinha (P/057)
 Markish Magpie Tumbler (D/902)
 Martham (GB/049)
 Masurian Tumbler (PL/961)
 McLennan's Aberdonian 
 Megcer
 Memel Highflyer (D/815)
 Micholaiyvski Shield Tumbler
 Miniature American Crested
 Mittelhause Pigeon (D/045)
 Modena (GB/205)
 Modern Show Flight
 Modern Spanish Thief Pouter
 Monor Tumbler (H/945)
 Montauban (F/003)
 Mookee (D/820)
 Moravian Bagdad (CZ/111)
 Moravian Magpie Cropper (CZ/311)
 Moravian Morak Cropper (CZ/312)
 Moravian Strasser (CZ/022)
 Moravian White-head
 Morillero Cropper (E/341)
 Morrillero Alicantino Pouter
 Moroncelo Cropper (E/342)
 Moscat
 Moscovite Tumbler
 Moscow Black Magpie pigeon (RUS(D)/985)
 Moulter
 Muffed Helmet (= Polish Helmet, = Polish Krymka Tumbler (PL/934))
 Mulhouse Pigeon (F/010)
 Munsterland Field Pigeon (D/407)
 Muntenia White-tail Tumbler (RO/977)

N

 Naked-neck Tumbler (RO(D)/853)
 New York Danish Flying Tumbler
 Nish Highflyer (SRB/887)
 Nord Caucasian Tumbler (RUS(D)/872)
 Norwegian Tumbler (N/880)
 Norwich Cropper (GB/306)
 Novisad Short-faced Tumbler (SRB/889)
 Nun (GB/896) (= English Nun) 
 Nuremberg Lark pigeon (D/448)
 Nuremberg Swallow pigeon (D/447)
 Nis Highflyer

O

 Old Austrian Tumbler (A/834)
 Old Dutch Capuchine (NL/603)
 Old Dutch Tumbler (NL/826)
 Old Dutch Turbit (NL/703)
 Old Fashioned Oriental Frill (= Old Oriental Owl pigeon (D(USA)/726))
 Old German Cropper (D/301)
 Old German Magpie Tumbler (D/828)
 Old German Moor-head (D/479)
 Old German Nun
 Old German Owl pigeon (D/704)
 Old German Turbit
 Old Holland Pouter
 Old Oriental Owl pigeon (D(USA)/726) (= Old Fashioned Oriental Frill)
 Old Style English Flying Saddle Tumbler
 Old Vienna Highflyer (A/982)
 Orbetean Romanian Rust-coloured Highflyer (RO/1004)
 Oriental Frill (GB/714)
 Oriental Roller (D/850)
 Orientale Eastslowakian Roller (SK/980)
 Oriental Turbit
 Ostrava Bagdad (CZ/109)
 Ostrowiec Wattle Pigeon (PL/117)

P
 Pazardchin Roller (BG/992)
 Pakistani Highflyer
 Pappatacci
 Parlor Roller
 Parlor Tumbler pigeons, a breed group of fancy pigeons
 Pemba Green Pigeon
 Persian Highflyer  -->
 Piacentino (I/004)
 Piestanau Giant Pigeon (SK/048)
 Pigmy Mariola
 Pigmy Pouter (GB/329)
 Pinta Tumbler (E/926)
 Polish Bagdad (PL/114)
 Polish Barb
 Polish Beauty Homer (PL/065)
 Polish Crest Tumbler (PL/877)
 Polish Eagle pigeon (PL/963)
 Polish Gansel Tumbler
 Polish Griwuni Tumbler (PL/937)
 Polish Helmet (= Polish Krymka Tumbler (PL/934)) 
 Polish Highflyer (= Galician Highflyer)
 Polish Kronen Tumbler
 Polish Krymka Tumbler (PL/934) (= Polish Helmet)
 Polish Long-faced Tumbler (PL/802)
 Polish Lynx (D/024)
 Polish Masciuch Tumbler (PL/960)
Polish Murzyn  
 Polish Orlik (= Ukrainian Skycutter, NPA; see also: Polish Eagle pigeon (PL/963) and Polish Wilna Eagle pigeon (PL/964))
 Polish Owl pigeon (PL/724) 
 Polish Shield Highflyer (PL/965)
 Polish Short-beaked Tumbler (PL/948)
 Polish Short-beaked Magpie Tumbler (PL/969)
 Polish Wattle Pigeon (PL/116)
 Polish Wilna Eagle pigeon (PL/964)
 Pomeranian Cropper (D/303)
 Pomeranian Show Crest Highflyer (D/817)
 Portuguese Breeder
 Portuguese Tumbler (P/921)
 Posen Colour-head Tumbler (D/910)
 Poster (CH/485)
 Prachen Kanik (CZ/021)
 Prague Short-faced Tumbler(CZ/913)
 Prague Medium-faced Tumbler
 Prishtina Roller
 Ptarmigan pigeon (GB/611)

Q
Quet Roller

R

 Racing Homer
 Rafeno Cropper (E/335)
 Rakovnik Roller (CZ/885)
 Rawson Short-faced Tumbler
 Razgrad Roller (BG/993)
 Refilador Tumbler (E/925)
 Regensburg Tumbler (D/852)
 Reinaugen Tumbler (= Koenigsberg Reinaugen Tumbler (D/906))
 Renaisien (B/051)
 Revellois (F/013)
 Reverse-wing Colour Pigeon (D/476)
 Reverse-wing Pouter (= Reverse-wing Cropper (D/304))
 Rhine Ring-beater (D/1103)
 Ribbon-tail Tumbler (RUS(D)/866)
 Riga Tumbler (D/823)
 Rollers, a breed group
 Romagnol (I/005)
 Romanian Argintiu Tumbler
 Romanian Barred Highflyer (RO/978)
 Romanian Beard
 Romanian Black-cherry Tumbler
 Romanian Blind Tumbler
 Romanian Blue-barred White-tail
 Romanian Cherry-coloured Highflyer (RO/1002)
 Romanian Coffee-coloured Tumbler
 Romanian Gagiu
 Romanian Magpie Tumbler (RO(D)/854)
 Romanian Moriscar Roller
 Romanian Naked-neck Tumbler (= Naked-neck Tumbler (RO(D)/853))
 Romanian Silvery Tumbler
 Romanian Orbetean Tumbler (= Orbetean Romanian Rust-coloured Highflyer (RO/1003))
 Romanian Tshoong Tumbler
 Romanian White-tail Tumbler (RO(D)/855)
 Romanian Satu-Mare Tumbler
 Roshan Chirag
 Rostock Tumbler (D/901)
 Rostov Tumbler (RUS(D)/873)
 Roubaisien (F/052)
 Royal Snow Tumbler  
 Runt (F/001)
 Russe Blue Tumbler (BG/995)
 Russe Tschilbolli (BG/996)
 Russe Tumbler (BG/994)
 Russian Akkermann Tumbler
 Russian Martini
 Russian Tumbler
 Rzhev Star-tail Tumbler (= Ribbon-tail Tumbler (RUS(D)/866))
 Rock Dove

S

 Saar Pigeon (D/011)
 Saddle Homer
 Saint
 Saint Gallen Wing Pigeon (CH/431)
 Saint Louis Arch Crested Fantail
 Sarajewo Roller (BiH/888)
 Satu-Mare Tumbler
 Saxon Breast (D/474)
 Saxon Crescent Pigeon (D/473)
 Saxon Cropper (D/316)
 Saxon Fairy Swallow pigeon
 Saxon Field Pigeon (D/475)
 Saxon Monk (D/467)
 Saxon Priest (D/466)
 Saxon Shield (D/471)
 Saxon Spot (D/472)
 Saxon Stork Pigeon (D/470)
 Saxon Swallow pigeon (D/468)
 Saxon White-tail (D/465)
 Saxon Wing Pigeon (D/469)
 Scandaroon (D/105)
 Schalaster Pouter
 Schmalkalden Moorhead (D/602)
 Schmolln Trumpeter (D/511)
 Schoeneberg Barred Tumbler (D/903)
 Schumen Tumbler (BG/997)
 Seldschuk Pigeon (D/613)
 Seraphim Pigeon
 Serbian Highflyer (SRB/886)
 Shack Kee
 Shakhsharli
 Shiraz Tumbler (D/920)
 Short-beaked Armavir Tumbler (RUS(D)/841)
 Short-faced Gansel Tumbler (H/842)
 Show Antwerp (GB/026)
 Show Homer (GB/027)
 Showpen Homer (Australian equivalent of American Show Racer)
 Show Racing Homer
 Shumen Tumbler (BG/997)
 Siberian Tumbler (RUS(D)/962)
 Silesian Colour-head (CZ/064)
 Silesian Cropper (D/323)
 Silesian Moorhead (D/480)
 Silesian White-head
 Silky Fantail
 Single-crested Priest
 Sisak Roller (HR/938)
 Sivas Kumru Güvercin
 Slovakian Cropper (SK(D)/322)
 Slovakian Highflyer (SK/932)
 Slowenien White-head (SLO/060)
 Smyter (B/053)
 Sobji ( Bangladeshi High Flyer and racing breed)
 Sobuj neck  Bangladeshi High Flyer Pigeons
 Sofia Tumbler (BG/998)
 Sombor (= Bácka Long-beaked Tumbler (SRB(D)/859))
 Sottobanca (= Italian Sottobanca (I/019))
 Sottobanca, French type (F/020)
 South Batschka Tumbler (H/941)
 South German Blasse (D/435)
 South German Breast (D/440) (
 South German Charcoal Lark pigeon (D/432)
 South German Monk (muffed (D/436) and clean-legged (D/437))
 South German Moorhead (D/439)
 South German Shield (D/438)
 South German Spot (D/441)
 South German Tiger-head (D/433)
 South German White-tail (D/434)

 Spanish Bagdad
 Spanish Barb
 Spanish Flamenca (E/113)
 Spanish Flamenca Runt
 Spanish Frillback Bagadette
 Spanish Gabacho Runt
 Spanish Little Friar Tumbler
 Spanish Mondain
 Spanish Monjin
 Spanish Naked-neck
 Spanish Nun
 Spanish Owl pigeon
 Spanish Owl Pouter
 Spanish Pigeon (D/046)
 Spanish Strawberry Eye (E/118)
 Spanish Thief Pouter
 Spangeled Magpie Purzler of Satu-Mare
 Speelderke (B/1101)
 Srebrniak (Perlovy)
 Stapar Tumbler (SRB(D)/890)
 Stargard Shaker (D/818)
 Starling pigeon (D/405)
 Starwitzer Cropper (D/320)
 Steinheim Bagdad (D/108)
 Steller Cropper (D/319)
 Stettin Tumbler (D/912)
 Steiger Cropper (D/318)
 Stork Pigeon de Lodz (PL/809)
 Stralsund Highflyer (D/804)
 Strasser pigeon (D/023)
 Sverdlovsk blue-gray mottle-headed pigeon
 Swallow pigeon
 Swedish Owl pigeon (S/720)
 Swedish Tumbler (S/881)
 Swing Pouter (Stavak Pouter, Steller Pouter)
 Swiss Crescent
 Swiss Mondain
 Swiss Pouter (CH/348)
 Swiss Self (CH/416)
 Syrian Bagdad
 Syrian Coop Tumbler
 Syrian Curled Dewlap (F/040)
 Syrian Dewlap (GB/039)
 Syrian Fantail
 Syrian Halabi
 Syrian Sabuni Tumbler
 Syrian Swift pigeon (GB/044)
 Syrian  (= Barbarisi Owl pigeon (SYR(D)/725))
 Szegedin Highflyer (H/861)
 Szekesfehervar Tumbler (H/942)
 Szolnok Bagdad (H/115)
 Szolnok Tumbler (H/940)
Safchila
Shuwa Chondon

T
 Taganrog Tumbler (RUS(D)/867)
 Takla Tumbler
 Taqlaji
 Targovist Tumbler (BG/999)
 Targovista red Highflyer (RO/1005)
 Texan Pioneer (ESKT/012)
 Thai Fantail
 Thai Laugher
 Thurgau Crescent (CH/425)
 Thurgau Elmer (CH/424)
 Thurgau Monk (CH/426)
 Thurgau Peak-crested
 Thurgau Shield (CH/427)
 Thurgau White-tail (CH/428)
 Thuringian Breast (D/461)
 Thuringian Colour pigeons, a group of pigeon breeds
 Thuringian Crescent Pigeon (D/463)
 Thuringian Cropper (D/324)
 Thuringian Goldbeetle (D/451)
 Thuringian Mauser Pigeon (D/453)
 Thuringian Monk (D/462)
 Thuringian Pouter (= Thuringian Cropper (D/324))
 Thuringian Self (D/450)
 Thuringian Shield Pigeon (D/459)
 Thuringian Spot (D/460)
 Thuringian Stork Pigeon (D/457)
 Thuringian Swallow pigeon (D/456)
 Thuringian White Bib (D/455)
 Thuringian White-head (D/454)
 Thuringian White-tail (D/452)
 Thuringian Wing Pigeon (D/458)
 Tiger Swallow pigeon (→ Bohemian Tiger Swallow, muffed (CZ/477) and Bohemian Tiger Swallow, clean-legged (CZ/478))
 Tippler
 Timișoara Tumbler (RO(D)/856)
 Tokur
 Transylvanian Back-crested Tumbler
 Transylvanian Double-crested Tumbler (RO(D)/863)
 Transylvanian Tumbler (without any crest)
 Travnik Highflyer (BiH/946)
 Trenton
 Triganino Modena (I/207)
 Tula Ribbon-tail Tumbler (RUS (D)/865)
 Tumbler Pigeons
 Tunesian Owl pigeon (F/721)
 Tung Koon Paak
 Turbit (GB/711)
  (GB/716)

U
 Ural striped maned pigeon
 Usbekian Tumbler (RUS(D)/892)

V

 Valencian Cropper, Dutch type (NL/333)
 Valencian Figurita (= Valencian Frill (E/722))
 Valencian Giant Tenant Pigeon
 Valencian Homer
 Valencian Magany Homer
 Valencian Peter Runt
 Varna Tumbler (BG/1000)
 Veleño Pouter

 Vienna Highflyer (A/981)
 Vienna Muffed Tumbler
 Vienna Röserlscheck (A/983)
 Viennese Gansel Tumbler (A/839)
 Vienna Long-faced Tumbler (A/835)
 Viennese Short-faced Tumbler (A/838)
 Viennese White-side Tumbler (A/837)
 Vogtland White-head Trumpeter (D/507)
 Volga Tumbler (RUS(D)/874)
 Voorburg Shield Cropper (NL/327)
 Vrschatschka Tumbler (SRB/947)

W
 Waldviertel Cropper (A/350)
 Warsaw Butterfly Tumbler (PL/936)
 West of England Tumbler (GB/833)
 Wiggetal Colour-tail (CH/429)
 Wolverhampton Badge Tumbler (GB/917)
 Wolverhampton Magpie Tumbler (GB/916)
 Wurttemberg Moorhead (D/442)
 White Racing Doves

Z
 Zagreb Tumbler (HR/951)
 Zira Gola ( Bangladeshi High Flyer)
 Zitterhall (= Stargard Shaker (D/818))
 Zurich White-tail (CH/430)

References

 EE-List of the breeds of fancy pigeons (ELFP). Authorized and published by the Section for Fancy pigeons of the European Association of Poultry-, Pigeon- and Rabbit breeders (Entente Européenne d’ Áviculture et de Cuniculture, EE). Revision 11 June 2012

 Seymour, Rev. Colin (Ed)(2006) Australian Fancy Pigeons National Book of Standards.

List of pigeon breeds
Pigeon
Pigeon